Gheorghe Toma (born 1929, date of death unknown) was a Romanian footballer who played as a defender.

International career
Gheorghe Toma played one friendly match for Romania, on 29 May 1955 under coach Gheorghe Popescu I in a 2–2 against Poland.

Honours
Dinamo București
Divizia A: 1955

Notes

References

External links
 

1929 births
Year of death missing
Romanian footballers
Romania international footballers
Place of birth missing
Association football defenders
Liga I players
FC Dinamo București players